Poong may refer to:

 Kim Poong (born 1978), South Korean webtoon artist
 Poong language, aka Pong, a dialect of Cuoi
 Tay Poong language, variously, the Tho languages
 Poong, the Joseon Psychiatrist, a 2022 South Korean television series

See also

 
 Pong (disambiguation)

Disambiguation pages